The 2020–21 Chattanooga Mocs men's basketball team represented the University of Tennessee at Chattanooga in the 2020–21 NCAA Division I men's basketball season. The Mocs, led by fourth-year head coach Lamont Paris, played their home games at McKenzie Arena in Chattanooga, Tennessee, as members of the Southern Conference.

Previous season
The Mocs finished the season 20–13, 10–8 in SoCon play to finish in a tie for fifth place. They defeated UNC Greensboro in the quarterfinals of the SoCon tournament before losing in the semifinals to Wofford.

Roster

Schedule and results

|-
!colspan=12 style=| Non-conference Regular season

|-
!colspan=12 style=| SoCon Regular season

|-
!colspan=9 style=| SoCon tournament

Source

See also
 2020-21 Chattanooga Mocs women's basketball

References

Chattanooga Mocs men's basketball seasons
Chattanooga Mocs
Chattanooga Mocs men's basketball
Chattanooga Mocs men's basketball